Agudos do Sul is a municipality in the state of Paraná in the Southern Region of Brazil.

As of 2020, IBGE reported Agudos do Sul had a population of 9,470.

See also
List of municipalities in Paraná

References

Municipalities in Paraná